It's Uptown is the second studio album by jazz/soul guitarist George Benson.

Background
George Benson's second album and the first of two to be produced by John Hammond. Recorded after his move to CBS.

Track listing

2007 remastered CD / Blu-spec CD bonus tracks

Personnel
The George Benson Quartet
George Benson – guitar, vocals on "Summertime", "A Foggy Day" and "Stormy Weather"
Ronnie Cuber – baritone saxophone
Bennie Green – trombone
Lonnie Smith – organ
Jimmy Lovelace – drums
Ray Lucas – drums (tracks 2, 3)
with:
Blue Mitchell – trumpet (tracks 14–15)
Charlie Persip  – drums (tracks 14–15)
Don Hunstein - photography

References

George Benson albums
1966 albums
Columbia Records albums
Albums produced by John Hammond (producer)